Boswells of Oxford was the largest independent family-run department store in Oxford, England. The store closed in 2020.

The store first traded in 1738, and was the second oldest family-owned department store in the world. It was initially founded by Francis Boswell and located at 50 Cornmarket Street. Boswells started up in business manufacturing and selling luggage and trunks, and it is believed their wares were taken on Captain Cook's trip to explore the Southern Hemisphere. The business remained in the Boswell family until 1890 when there was no one left for direct succession. The ownership passed to Arthur Pearson, the then owner of the Oxford Drug Company. Boswells and the Oxford Drug Company are still owned by the Pearson family and, unusually for a Department Store, Boswells still contained a Pharmacy - right until it closed. In 1928, it expanded its premises with the main entrance moving to Broad Street, opposite Balliol College and close to the spot (marked with a cross in the middle of the road) where the Oxford Martyrs were burnt at the stake in the 16th century.

The store was traditional in style and a local shopping landmark, particularly for toys, kitchenware, and luggage, continuing the tradition from 1738. It retained a smaller side entrance at the north end of Cornmarket Street, which was originally the Oxford Drug Company building. Its address is now 1–4 Broad Street. The company did not use an apostrophe in its name, although others sometimes mistakenly do so.

In 2014, the store launched an e-commerce website to replace a purely marketing website and sold products from all its departments online. In 2015, Boswells expanded upstairs to create a new tearoom and customer toilets, and added a takeaway cafe in 2018. The store departments were:

 Basement – Cookshop and Kitchen Electricals, Hardware, Household Essentials, Lighting, Small Electricals, Tableware
 Ground Floor – Cosmetics, Accessories, Umbrellas and Bags, Gifts, Luggage, Pharmacy, Tourism, Broad Street Cafe
 First Floor – 1738 Tearoom, Toys and Games
 Second Floor – Bedding and Bathrooms, Customer Toilets, Haberdashery, Parcel Collection point

In 2020, there was a closing down sale after 282 years of trading. The COVID-19 pandemic brought forward the closure of the store. The store closed due to the crisis, apart from the pharmacy, which closed on 11 April 2020.

References

Bibliography

External links

 Boswells website on Archive.org
 Boswells of Oxford Limited information from Google Finance
 Touch Oxford information

1738 establishments in England
2020 disestablishments in England
Retail companies established in 1738
Retail companies disestablished in 2020
Department stores of the United Kingdom
Independent stores
Shops in Oxford
History of Oxford